The Flask is a Grade II listed public house at 14 Flask Walk, Hampstead, London, on the site from where the trade in Hampstead mineral water was run, and which is mentioned in the eighteenth century novel Clarissa. It has been owned by Young's Brewery since 1904.

Name
It was originally known as the Lower Flask, to distinguish it from the Upper Flask, a tavern near the top of Hampstead hill which was patronised by Whig grandees and writers but which closed in the 1750s. The clientele of the Lower Flask was considered inferior; and it appears in Samuel Richardson's novel Clarissa as the place of a drunk, "I have got the fellow down! — I have got old Grimes — hah, hah, hah, hah! — He is at the Lower Flask — almost in the condition of David's sow...".  It was also known as the Thatched House until the premises were rebuilt by Cumming and Nixon in 1874, when it became known just as The Flask.

History

On the site stood the original Flask Tavern from where the Hampstead mineral water business was run from at least 1700. The distribution of the water, at 3d per flask, was arranged by a London apothecary called Mr Philips, who operated in Fleet Street from the Eagle and Child pub. The advertising claimed that "eminent physicians and many gentry who had previously drunk the Tunbridge waters" now preferred the Hampstead water.

Interior
There are four distinct areas. At the front are a public bar and a separate saloon bar. The public bar is more basic and would originally have charged less than the grander saloon. These two bars have original features, but to the rear lies a more modern area for drinking and a conservatory.  According to CAMRA, the outstanding features of the interior are the wood and glass screen that separates the two bars, and the five chromolithographs of paintings by the Belgian artist Jan Van Beers. CAMRA also note the appropriateness of the Van Beers surname for a pub.

Historic England comment on the relatively intact nature of the interior, noting the partitions made of glass and mahogany, the bar counter and fittings, the original cast-iron fireplaces and their tiled surrounds, the moulded cornices to the ceilings, the wall tiles and the "Victorian chromolithographs". They also note that during the building of a rear extension in 1990, a vaulted brick-built cellar was uncovered.

Exterior

English Heritage note that the building is of yellow stock brick with some stucco. They also comment on the "twin entrances set between tall windows and flanked by three pilasters enriched with glazed tiles, as well as paterae over pilasters at frieze level".

Flask Walk
The artist Charles Ginner's 1937 painting Flask Walk, Hampstead, on Coronation Day shows the vista down Flask Walk as seen from the upstairs of his residence at 61 Hampstead High Street, and includes The Flask on the right-hand side of the image. The painting was bought by the Tate Gallery in 1941.

Notable residents of Flask Walk have included the actor Peter Barkworth, the poet Al Alvarez, and the musician Sid Vicious.

See also
The Flask, Highgate

References

External links

The Flask in 2008, showing its former sign.

Buildings and structures in Hampstead
Grade II listed buildings in the London Borough of Camden
Grade II listed pubs in London
Pubs in the London Borough of Camden